Kevin Hunt is an Australian jazz pianist and composer.

Early life and education
Hunt's  first teacher was his father Ellis Hunt.

He trained at The Sydney Conservatorium of Music, alongside musicians such as Don Burrows, James Morrison, and George Golla. His teachers included Chuck Yates, John Speight and  David Levy.

Career
Hunt is a jazz pianist and composer. He has been a regular on the Jazz music scene since 1979, and has led his own ensembles performing his own compositions, but all those of classical composers like Johann Bach, Claude Debussy, Maurice Ravel and Leonard Bernstein.

He played in a trio called the JS Bach Trio, with Laurie Thompson and Gary Holgate.

From 1984 until 1988 he worked with the Kinetic Theatre company, an was assistant musical director of for Pope John Paul II Youth Celebration.

Recognition
In 1998 the JS Bach Trio (Hunt, with Laurie Thompson and Gary Holgate) won ABC Classic FM's listeners' choice award, for the recording Kevin Hunt plays JS Bach.

In 2001 he was awarded the Australian Elizabeth Theatre Trust Jazz Scholarship to study in New York, in pain and composition. He briefly worked at theAstralain International Conservatorium of Music and has also spoke at lecture on music. He was nominated for ARIA Awards for Best Jazz Album with Kevin Hunt - Plays JS Bach in 1998 and with Kevin Hunt Trio - Love Walked In in 2003.

Discography

Albums

Awards and nominations

ARIA Awards
The ARIA Music Awards are annual awards, which recognises excellence, innovation, and achievement across all genres of Australian music. They commenced in 1987. 

! 
|-
| 1998 || Kevin Hunt Plays JS Bach || Best Jazz Album ||  || 
|-
| 2003 || Love Walked In || Best Jazz Album ||  || 
|-

Mo Awards
The Australian Entertainment Mo Awards (commonly known informally as the Mo Awards), were annual Australian entertainment industry awards. They recognise achievements in live entertainment in Australia from 1975 to 2016. Kevin Hunt won one award in that time.
 (wins only)
|-
| 1998
| Kevin Hunt
| Jazz Instrumental Performer of the Year
| 
|-

References

External links
Kevin Hunt

Australian musicians
Living people
Year of birth missing (living people)